Tussock Island is an island 0.2 nautical miles (0.4 km) long, lying off the west side of Annenkov Island, South Georgia. Following geological work by British Antarctic Survey (BAS), 1972–73, it was named after the thick mantle of tussock grass (Poa flabellata) that grows on the island.

See also 
 List of Antarctic and sub-Antarctic islands

Islands of South Georgia